The 2001 Big 12 Conference softball tournament was held at ASA Hall of Fame Stadium in Oklahoma City, OK from May 9 through May 12, 2001. Oklahoma won their second conference tournament and earned the Big 12 Conference's automatic bid to the 2001 NCAA Division I softball tournament.

,  and  received bids to the NCAA tournament. Oklahoma would go on to play in the 2001 Women's College World Series.

Standings
Source:

Schedule
Source:

All-Tournament Team
Source:

References

Big 12 Conference softball tournament
Tournament
Big 12 softball tournament